The River Anker is a river in England that flows through the centre of Nuneaton. It is a major tributary of the River Tame, which it joins in Tamworth. The name of the river derives from an old British term for winding river.

Course
The river rises near Wolvey and flows in a north-westerly direction to pass between Bramcote and Burton Hastings, it is designated a main river at Stretton Baskerville where it also forms the boundary between the boroughs of Rugby, Nuneaton and Bedworth. On the outskirts of Nuneaton it collects the Sketchley Brook, and then passes alongside the Liberty Way sports stadium. At this point the river splits, with a flood relief channel to the north, and the main channel passing through the Nuneaton town centre. The relief channel re-joins beyond the town at Weddington, where the river then continues in the same north-westerly direction to pass the village of Caldecote, then Mancetter (where it is crossed by Watling Street) and Witherley, before reaching Atherstone where it is joined by the River Sence.

Downstream of the confluence, it reaches Grendon and then flows through Polesworth before passing beneath the M42 motorway. Beyond the motorway it passes through Alvecote Pools and meadows, a  Site of Special Scientific Interest (SSSI) and nature reserve. It continues past Amington Hall before turning south-westerly to flow through Tamworth and join the River Tame near Tamworth Castle.

The Anker is popular with anglers and is known to contain some large pike and chub. Also there are barbel present with fish over 15 lb being reported.

Hydrology
The flow of the Anker has been measured at a gauging station in its lower reaches at Polesworth since 1966.

Flooding
The River Anker has flooded Nuneaton town centre several times in the past, including 1968, prompting the construction of a  flood relief channel in Weddington in 1976.

In July 2007 the river flooded the Liberty Way pitch, forcing Nuneaton Town and Nuneaton RFC to cancel matches while the river water drained away.

See also
List of rivers of England

References

External links

Rivers of Staffordshire
Rivers of Warwickshire
1Anker